Arnaud Clément and Sébastien Grosjean were the defending champions but did not compete that year.

Michael Hill and Jeff Tarango won in the final 7–6(7–2), 6–3 against Pablo Albano and David Macpherson.

Seeds

  Michael Hill /  Jeff Tarango (champions)
  Pablo Albano /  David Macpherson (final)
  Julien Boutter /  Daniel Orsanic (first round)
  Simon Aspelin /  Johan Landsberg (first round)

Draw

External links
 2001 Grand Prix Hassan II Doubles Draw

Doubles
- Doubles, 2001 Grand Prix Hassan Ii